Bolsheignatovsky District (Pokš Ignadbuje; , Otsü Ignatovań ajmak) is an administrative and municipal district (raion), one of the twenty-two in the Republic of Mordovia, Russia. It is located in the northeast of the republic. Its administrative center is the rural locality (a selo) of Bolshoye Ignatovo. As of the 2010 Census, the total population of the district was 8,313, with the population of Bolshoye Ignatovo accounting for 34.2% of that number.

Administrative and municipal status
Within the framework of administrative divisions, Bolsheignatovsky District is one of the twenty-two in the republic. The district is divided into twelve selsoviets which comprise thirty-seven rural localities. As a municipal division, the district is incorporated as Bolsheignatovsky Municipal District. Its twelve selsoviets are incorporated into twelve rural settlements within the municipal district. The selo of Bolshoye Ignatovo serves as the administrative center of both the administrative and municipal district.

References

Notes

Sources

Districts of Mordovia
 
